The coat of arms of Queensland is the oldest in Australia, and was first granted by Queen Victoria in 1893 through the simplest form of heraldic grants; with the shield of arms, motto, helmet, mantling and crest.

Suggestions and submissions 
Up to 1892, suggestions were being made as to what the state's coat of arms was to constitute and the pictures below illustrate the four main depictions that were considered.

Below are the four proposed coat of arms submitted to the British College of Arms and from which the first edition of the coat of arms was taken.

These suggestions were accompanied by a letter by the Chief Secretary to the Government Office in London.

Heraldic description 

Below is the blazon:

'Per fesse, the Chief Or, the Base per pale Sable and Gules, in chief a Bull's head couped in profile muzzled, and a merino Ram's head respecting each other proper, the dexter charged with a Garb of the first, and in the sinister Base on a mount a Pile of Quartz, issuant there from a Gold Pyramid, in front of the Mount a Spade surmounted by a Pick saltire-wise all proper'

Modernised, this means:

'Across the top of the shield a gold panel on which there is a bull's head in profile muzzled, cut off at the neck and a merino ram's head, facing each other, both naturally coloured. In the lower portion of the shield on the left hand side on the black background a golden sheaf of wheat; on the right side on a red background and on a green mound, a golden obelisk standing on a pile of quartz with a crossed pick and shovel in the foreground'

Development and change 
The development of the coat of arms continued during the year and by the end of 1893, the Maltese Cross impaled with a crown had been incorporated, above the shield in between the two stalks of sugar cane.

In 1902 the heraldic depiction of the British Imperial Crown was standardised to the (symbolic) Tudor Crown. Following 1953, this was switched to a depiction of the actual St. Edward's Crown.

The final and current addition to the coat of arms was created in 1977, during the Silver Jubilee of Queen Elizabeth II, with the granting of supporting animal. A red deer, to represent the old world and it is a classic animal of heraldry; and a brolga, which represents the native population and it is the state's official bird.

Industrial influence
The symbols on the shield are representations of Queensland's most abundant industries. The wheat industry's origins belong with the first settlers in 1788, as the farms were worked by the convicts brought over from England, an idea of Governor Phillip. During the years till 1795, the wheat industry slowly gained popularity and by the late 19th century was a strong force in the agricultural industry of the state. The sugar industry became established by 1868 in Mackay which was a mere four years after the first commercial sugar mill was opened in Cleveland, south of Brisbane. Sugar and Coffee regulations were brought in by Parliament later that year as the industry spread rapidly and with the creation of the Mackay Central Sugar Mill Manufacturing Company ten years later in 1878, the sugar industry had reached its colonial peak.

The sheep industry had been in existence since the early 1820s within Australia and by the early 1880s the geographical expansion of this industry had hit Queensland in which major wool auctions were held throughout the state. The mining industry began with the discovery of copper on 20 May 1867 by Ernest Henry in Cloncurry and the industry climbed with the Gold Rush which occurred on 3 September 1873 when gold was discovered in Georgetown. The beef industry was quite prevalent by the late 1880s and by 1890, Queensland had exported Australia's first major export overseas which consisted of 1500 tons and by the 20th century that number had exploded to 43000 tons.

Supporting animals 

As for the supporting animals, the brolga is Australia's only native crane and is described as "more than a metre tall and their outstretched wings can measure two metres across. The adults are mainly grey and have a long thin neck, a bare head and a patch of striking red coloured skin on the lower part of the head below the eyes". They are mostly found along the coast from Rockhampton to the Gulf of Carpentaria and have featured on the coat of arms since 1977 and has been the state bird since 1986. The red deer has a more regal origin; along with being a traditional and classic beast of heraldry, Queen Victoria gave the newly created colony a herd of deer from the royal hunting ground—hence their inclusion upon the arms.

Maltese Cross 
The Maltese cross has a stranger history than the rest of the elements upon the arms. Not even the Queensland government is aware of why the Maltese Cross was chosen for the coat of arms, as described in the letter below which resides in the Queensland State Archives.

Gallery 
Below is a visual evolution of Queensland's coat of arms.

See also
Australian heraldry

External links

References

Queensland
Queensland
Queensland
Queensland
Queensland
Queensland
Queensland
Queensland
Queensland
Queensland